Mike Park is a Korean American musician and progressive activist. His musical ventures include Skankin' Pickle for whom he both played the saxophone and sang, The Chinkees, The Bruce Lee Band, and Ogikubo Station, as well as an acoustic solo project under his own name.  After his time with Skankin' Pickle he went on to found Asian Man Records, a label which he has run out of his garage in California since 1996 with only help from his parents and friends.  Asian Man Records supports mostly ska and punk bands.  Park will support any band as long as it is "anti-racist, anti-sexist, and anti-prejudice".  Park has used Asian Man Records to release his own music, in addition to providing a start for smaller bands to allow them to grow, including Less Than Jake, Alkaline Trio, and The Lawrence Arms.   In 1999 he formed the Plea for Peace Foundation an organization whose aim is "to promote the ideas of peace through the power of music", something which Park has been trying to do with his own bands and with the help of other groups.

Park was the impetus behind the Spring 1998 "Ska Against Racism" tour. The goal of the tour was to promote awareness about racism and raise money for anti-racism organisations such as the Museum of Tolerance. The national tour included The Toasters, Less Than Jake, the Blue Meanies, Mustard Plug, Five Iron Frenzy, MU330, Kemuri, and Mike Park himself.

Plea for Peace Foundation

The Plea for Peace Foundation was founded in 1999 by musician and founder of Asian Man Records, Mike Park. The Plea for Peace Foundations is a 501C3 Non-Profit Organization based in San Jose, California, in the United States. The organisation's stated goal is to "promote the ideas of peace through the power of music". Initially the foundation was only active in national and global music tours, but in 2007 it intends to open a youth center for children where they will be encouraged to "perform music, create art, dance and talk to others of similar interests".

In 2004, Plea for Peace organized a musical tour of the same name. The tour was a stand against President George W. Bush and the wars in Iraq and Afghanistan.

Personal life
Park grew up in Silicon Valley in Northern California, where he still lives. He majored in music in college.

He is a Minister of the Universal Life Church.

Discography

Solo
Michael Park (Asian Man, 2001)
For the Love of Music (Sub City, 2003)
North Hangook Falling (Sub City, 2005)
Mike Park 7 Inch and Art Print (Simple Stereo, 2008)
Beans & Toast (2008)
Mike Park/O Pioneers!!! split 7″ (Suburban Home, 2009)
Smile (Asian Man, 2011)

With 'Skankin' Pickle'

With 'The Chinkees'
The Chinkees Are Coming CD
Karaoke with the Chinkees 7"
Peace Through Music CD
Present Day Memories Split CD with Lawrence Arms (out of print)
Searching for a Brighter Future CD

With 'The Bruce Lee Band'

With 'Ogikubo Station'
 Ogikubo Station S/P (Asian Man, 2017)

References

External links

Asian Man Records
Plea For Peace Official Site
Interview by Sound Scene Revolution (Podcast)
Interview by Tom Bastian of decapolis.com (2000)
 Interview by Josh Snider and Jonny Havoc on BigSmileMagazine.com

Living people
American male singers
American punk rock singers
American musicians of Korean descent
Asian Man Records
Sub City Records artists
1969 births